Zonya Foco, RD, CHFI, CSP (born Zonya Edwards on March 21, 1963 in Ann Arbor, Michigan) is an Professional Speaker, television chef, and writer. She focuses more on healthy eating than on dieting.

Foco received her bachelor's degree from Eastern Michigan University in 1987 and worked for eight years as a clinical nutritionist for the Michigan Heart and Vascular Institute at St. Joseph Mercy Hospital in Ann Arbor. Zonya has appeared on local newscasts, nationally syndicated daytime talk shows, and QVC. She has been published in Prevention, Today's Dietitian, Total Health, and Fast and Healthy Cooking.

Family/Personal life
Foco and her husband Scott have one child, Ridge. Scott Foco serves as executive producer of the PBS program Zonya s Health Bites out of their home on Osprey Lake in Onsted, Michigan, about an hour's drive northwest of Toledo, Ohio.

Writings
Her experiences led her to write Lickety-Split Meals for Health Conscious People on the Go in 1998. She also authored The Power of One Good Habit and Water With Lemon.

References

External links
Zonya Foco official website

1963 births
Living people
American women nutritionists
American nutritionists
American television chefs
Eastern Michigan University alumni
Writers from Ann Arbor, Michigan
American cookbook writers
Women cookbook writers
American women chefs
American women non-fiction writers
21st-century American women